Mattia Croci-Torti (born 10 April 1982) is a Swiss professional football manager and former player, who currently manages Lugano.

Club career
Croci-Torti spent his entire playing career between the Swiss 1. Liga and Swiss Challenge League. He began his career with Chiasso in 1999, and ended his career with them in 2014 representing various other clubs from Ticino in between.

Managerial career 
After retiring as a footballer, Croci-Torti returned to Chiasso as assistant manager. He was briefly the manager of the club Balerna in 2015, before moving to Lugano as assistant from 2017 to 2021, with a short stint as Mendrisio manager in 2018. On 1 September 2021, he was named the manager of Lugano in the Swiss Super League replacing Abel Braga. He helped Lugano win the Swiss Cup on 15 May 2022, 29 years since the club last won the trophy.

Honours
Lugano
Swiss Cup: 2021–22

References

External links
SFL player profile
SFL manager Profile
WorldFootball Profile

1982 births
Living people
Swiss men's footballers
Swiss people of Italian descent
Swiss football managers
Association football fullbacks
Swiss Super League managers
Swiss 1. Liga (football) players
Swiss Challenge League players
FC Chiasso players
FC Lugano players
FC Wil players
Sportspeople from Ticino